Kaskaskia College is a public community college in Centralia, Illinois. Kaskaskia College's Community College District 501 serves all or part of nine counties, including Bond, Clinton, Fayette, Marion, Washington, Jefferson, St. Clair, Madison and Montgomery.

History
The college originated in 1940 as the first community college in the state established under the Junior College Act. The current president is George Evans. Previous presidents include Alice Mumaw-Jacobs, Bruce Stahl, Paul Blowers, and Oscar Corbell (original founder).

Academics
Kaskaskia College Associate of Arts and Associate of Science Degrees for students who wish to transfer to four-year colleges and universities.  The college also offers 50 associate degree career programs and 102 certificates in occupational areas. As of December 6, 2021, Kaskaskia College is accredited by the Higher Learning Commission.

Campus

Kaskaskia College's main campus is located on approximately 190 acres three miles west of Centralia.  The college has since constructed additional education centers in the communities of Vandalia, Salem, Greenville, Trenton and Nashville.  The college also houses its heavy occupation programs, Heating and Air Conditioning, Carpentry, Welding, Industrial Technology at the Crisp Technology Center on Route 161 East in Centralia.

References

External links
Official website

Community colleges in Illinois
Centralia, Illinois
Education in Clinton County, Illinois
NJCAA athletics